The Endless Trench is a 2019 Spanish-French historical drama film directed by Jon Garaño, Aitor Arregi and Jose Mari Goenaga. It premiered at the 2019 San Sebastián International Film Festival, where it won the Silver Shell for Best Director and the Jury Prize for Best Screenplay. It was selected as the Spanish entry for the Best International Feature Film at the 93rd Academy Awards, but it was not nominated.

At the outbreak of the Spanish Civil War in 1936, young newlyweds Higinio and Rosa are worried about the risk of reprisal killings, as Higinio is a Republican. He hides in a hole underneath their house with his wife's help. Despite the constant threat of discovery, as the  Falangists search for him, the couple's love helps them to remain resilient. Higinio becomes increasingly isolated in his hiding spot, where he stays until the 1969 amnesty. The story is told in chapter-like sections, each with titles alluding to the themes.

Plot

In 1936, at the start of the Spanish Civil War, a newly-married man who has criticized the Nationalist army and government fears that he will be the victim of reprisal killings and goes into hiding. As Falangists search for him, he hides under the floor of his house with the help of his wife. The first section, titled “campeada” ("to run”) depicts his first period where he is on the run from his pursuers.

The next section is titled “esconder” (“to hide”) shows his  betrayal by his neighbor, and then his move to a trench dug under the kitchen. The next section is titled “detención” (“temporary loss of freedom”). During this section, the couple start to imagine that the Republicans will win the civil war, but this is only a fantasy.

The next section is titled Peligro (danger). As the political situation worsens, Higinio's wife is arrested, but she does not betray her husband's hiding place. The next section is titled Encerrar  (shut down). It is about his isolation in his hiding spot. His wife gets pregnant with a child who might be theirs, or perhaps the child of a policeman who raped Rosa and then was killed by Higinio and Rosa.  At times Rosa is gone from the house for a time when she goes elsewhere to give birth to the child. When two gay men start staying in the house, Higinio befriends them.

The next section is called Apartado (remote). Higinio starts to feel very isolated and detached from outside world, which he can only see in glimpses through the curtains or from muffled sounds. He tries to follow the news on the radio and TV to learn more. In the Cambiar (change) and Franco (frank) sections, Higino goes through a major change. With the birth of their son Jaime (who Rosa identifies to the neighbors as her nephew), Higinio starts to reconsider whether he should remain in hiding. His wife tells him the family has been needing his help.

In the next section, his wife and son start to question why he remains in hiding, arguing that no one is still looking for him. In the neighborhood, it is becoming well known that he is living under the house. However, he has become habituated to his isolation, and it is hard for him to leave his hole.

The next chapter is titled Desenterrar. Higinio realizes that it is probably safe to come out of hiding. When, in 1969, the Franco government announces an amnesty, and pardons him for his political offenses, he still cannot leave the trench. After 33 years, his isolation has become his normal life.

The final chapter, Salir (go out), begins when his wife, Rosa,  threatens to leave him, realizing that Higinio is too trapped in fear. Finally, he manages to leave the hole, as many other "topos" ("moles") show themselves again.

Cast

Release
The film had its world premiere on September 22, 2019 at the 2019 San Sebastián International Film Festival.

The film was released in cinemas in Spain on October 31, 2019.

Awards and nominations 

|-
| align = "center" rowspan = "27" | 2020 || rowspan = "3" | 25th Forqué Awards || colspan = "2" | Best Film ||  || rowspan = "3" | 
|-
| Best Actress || Belén Cuesta || 
|-
| Best Actor || Antonio de la Torre (actor)|Antonio de la Torre || 
|-
| rowspan = "6" | 7th Feroz Awards || colspan = "2" | Best Drama Film ||  || rowspan = "6" | 
|-
| Best Director || Aitor Arregi, Jon Garaño, Jose Mari Goenaga || 
|-
| Best Screenplay || Luiso Berdejo, Jose Mari Goenaga || 
|-
| Best Actress (film) || Belén Cuesta || 
|-
| Best Actor (film) || Antonio de la Torre || 
|-
| Best Original Score || Pascal Gaigne || 
|-
| rowspan = "15" | 34th Goya Awards || colspan = "2" | Best Film ||  || rowspan = "15" | 
|-
| Best Director || Aitor Arregi, Jon Garaño, José Mari Goenaga || 
|-
| Best Actor || Antonio de la Torre || 
|-
| Best Actress || Belén Cuesta || 
|-
| Best New Actor || Vicente Vergara || 
|-
| Best Original Screenplay || José Mari Goenaga, Luiso Berdejo || 
|-
| Best Cinematography || Javi Agirre Erauso || 
|-
| Best Editing || Laurent Dufreche, Raúl López || 
|-
| Best Art Direction || Pepe Domínguez || 
|-
| Best Production Supervision || Ander Sistiaga || 
|-
| Best Sound || Iñaki Díez, Alazne Ameztoy, Xanti Salvador, Nacho Royo-Villanova || 
|-
| Best Special Effects || Jon Serrano, David Heras || 
|-
| Best Costume Design || Lourdes Fuentes, Saioa Lara || 
|-
| Best Makeup and Hairstyles || Yolanda Piña, Félix Terrero, Nacho Díaz || 
|-
| Best Original Score || Pascal Gaigne || 
|-
| rowspan = "3" | 29th Actors and Actresses Union Awards || Best Film Actor in a Leading Role || Antonio de la Torre ||  || rowspan = "3" | 
|-
| Best Film Actress in a Leading  Role || Belén Cuesta || 
|-
| Best Film Actor in a Minor Role || Emilio Palacios || 
|}

See also
 Manuel Cortés Quero, Spanish politician and mayor in which the film was based on.
 List of Spanish films of 2019
 The Blind Sunflowers, another Spanish film about a topo.
 List of submissions to the 93rd Academy Awards for Best International Feature Film
 List of Spanish submissions for the Academy Award for Best International Feature Film

References

External links
 
 

2019 films
Spanish historical drama films
Spanish Civil War films
Films set in Andalusia
Films set in the 1930s
Films set in the 1940s
Films set in the 1950s
Films set in the 1960s
2010s historical drama films
La Claqueta PC films
2010s Spanish films